Larry Tremblay (born April 17, 1954 in Chicoutimi) is a Canadian writer from Quebec. He is a two-time nominee for the Governor General's Award for French-language fiction, for Le Mangeur de bicyclette at the 2003 Governor General's Awards and for L'Orangeraie at the 2014 Governor General's Awards, and a nominee for the Governor General's Award for French-language drama at the 1997 Governor General's Awards for the published compilation of his plays Ogre and Cornemuse.

Several of his works have also been published in English translations by Sheila Fischman, Linda Gaboriau, Keith Turnbull and Chantal Bilodeau. The Bicycle Eater, Fischman's translation of Le Mangeur de bicyclette, was also a nominee for the Governor General's Award for French to English translation at the 2006 Governor General's Awards.

After completing a doctorate in theatre at the Université du Québec à Montréal, he travelled to India to study kathakali, which has remained an influence on his writing. Many of his plays focus on characters confronting psychological trauma. In Le Déclic du destin, a character progressively loses body parts; in The Dragonfly of Chicoutimi, the central character recovers from aphasia only to learn that while recovering his ability to speak he has lost his native language; and in La Hache a university professor is driven insane by his obsession with ideological purity in literature.

Tremblay has also taught acting at the Université du Québec à Montréal.

Works

Plays 
8 opérations (1978)
La Femme aux peupliers (1982)
Le Déclic du destin (1988)
Josse est-il parti? (1989)
Leçon d'anatomie (1992)
The Dragonfly of Chicoutimi (1993)
Le Génie de la rue Drolet (1994)
Ogre (1995)
Cornemuse (1996)
Éloge de la paresse (1997)
Tibullus ou Trois fois le prix d'un coq (1997)
Téléroman (1997)
Les Mains bleues (1997)
Les Huit péchés capitaux (éloges) (1997)
Roller (2000)
Le Ventriloque (2001)
English translation The Ventriloquist (2006)
Panda Panda (2004)
La Hache (2005)
A Chair in Love (2005)
Abraham Lincoln va au théâtre (2005)
English translation Abraham Lincoln Goes to the Theatre (2010)
L'Histoire d'un cœur (2006)
Le Problème avec moi (2007)
Cantate de guerre (2009)
English translation War Cantata (2014)
Burger Love (2009)
L'Enfant matière (2012)
Grande écoute (2015)

Fiction 
Le Mangeur de bicyclette (2002)
English translation The Bicycle Eater (2005)
Piercing (2006)
English translation Piercing (2010)
Le Christ obèse (2012)
English translation The Obese Christ (2014)
L'Orangeraie (2013)
 L'Arbre aux livre. 2017 online only, Full text
 The book tree. Granta, # 141, 2017 in English Transl. Sheila Fischman

Poetry 
La Place des yeux : poèmes (1989)
Gare à l'aube
Trois secondes où la Seine n'a pas coulé (2001)
L'Œil du soir (2009)
L'Arbre chorégraphe (2009)
L'Œil soldat (2019)

Essays 
Le Crâne des théâtres : essais sur les corps de l'acteur (1993)

References

1954 births
Living people
Canadian novelists in French
Canadian dramatists and playwrights in French
Canadian poets in French
Canadian male novelists
Canadian male stage actors
20th-century Canadian dramatists and playwrights
21st-century Canadian dramatists and playwrights
20th-century Canadian novelists
21st-century Canadian novelists
20th-century Canadian poets
Canadian male poets
21st-century Canadian poets
Male actors from Quebec
Writers from Saguenay, Quebec
Université du Québec à Montréal alumni
Academic staff of the Université du Québec à Montréal
Canadian male essayists
Canadian male dramatists and playwrights
20th-century Canadian essayists
21st-century Canadian essayists
20th-century Canadian male writers
21st-century Canadian male writers